The Northeast Collegiate Hockey Association (NECHA) is a non-varsity (club) college ice hockey league in the Northeast region of the United States that competes with Divisions II & III of the American Collegiate Hockey Association (ACHA). Most NECHA member schools have varsity teams that are affiliated with the Eastern College Athletic Conference (ECAC) or the Hockey East Association and most teams receive at least partial funding from their school's athletic departments and/or student government.

Format 
The NECHA league comprises four-year post secondary college and university teams separated into three conferences: Patriot, American, and Colonial. The Patriot and American conferences compete under Division II of the ACHA and the Colonial competes under Division III.

Each league conference consists of two divisions organized geographically by School location. Teams play a minimum of 10 league games during the regular season. Following the regular season, the NECHA league hosts their annual championship playoffs for each conference with invitations to the top teams in the regular season standings. 

Associate and Probationary Members are recognized teams but are not full-members of the league and are not eligible for the NECHA Regular Season Championship, the NECHA League Playoffs, and do not vote on actions at official league meetings.

Current members

Patriot Conference East

Patriot Conference West

American Conference North

American Conference South

Colonial Conference North

Colonial Conference South

Other members
NECHA Probationary Members

Saint Joseph's College of Maine

NECHA Associate Members

Gordon College
Trinity College
Tufts University
University of Maine
Wentworth Institute of Technology

Note: Boston College, Boston University, College of the Holy Cross, University of Connecticut, Harvard University, Merrimack College, Northeastern University, University of Maine, University of Massachusetts-Amherst, University of Massachusetts-Lowell and University of Vermont have NCAA varsity hockey programs at NCAA Division I level.

Saint Anselm College and Southern New Hampshire University have varsity hockey at the NCAA Division II level.

Norwich University, Trinity College, Tufts University, University of New England, and Westfield State University have varsity hockey at the NCAA Division III level.

See also 
American Collegiate Hockey Association
List of ice hockey leagues

ACHA Division 2 conferences
1982 establishments in the United States